Kharajgil (also Romanized as Kharajgīl, Kharej Gil, Kharjagīl, Kharjegīl, and Kharjgīl; also known as Harjehgil, Khardzhegil’, Kharfehgīl, and Kharjegīl-e Bālā) is a village in Kharajgil Rural District, Asalem District, Talesh County, Gilan Province, Iran. At the 2006 census, its population was 2,849, in 629 families.

References 

Populated places in Talesh County